Scarlet's Witch is a 2014 American thriller/fantasy theatrical film written/directed by F.C.Rabbath (Director of Listen (film), A Brilliant Monster, The Waiting (film)). The story is based on a short film by the same writer/director made in 2007. The film stars Emily Pearse, Callie Haskins, Bill Kelly and Julie Moss.

The film premiered in 2014 at Silver Lake Theater in Hollywood, California, and was subsequently shown in theaters.

Plot 
Alienated by her peers as a young girl, Scarlet finds escape from her loneliness in the forest where she meets a mysterious witch. Scarlet refuses the offer of magic at first, but maintains the friendship into her college years. When her blossoming relationship with a handsome boy at school is threatened by another girl, Scarlet turns to her old friend and her sorcery to get what she wants. Will her newfound powers fulfill all her desires or destroy everything she has known and loved?

Cast 
 Emily Pearse as Scarlet
 Julie Moss as Witch
 Avery Pohl as Young Scarlet

Critical reception 
Film Threat strongly recommended the film.
Tallahassee Reviews

Film selected early showing in the new UHD technology.

References

External links 
 

2014 films
2014 fantasy films
Films about witchcraft
2010s English-language films
American fantasy thriller films
2010s American films